The Religious of the Assumption is an international Roman Catholic women's congregation founded by Saint Marie Eugénie Milleret in Paris in 1839, and dedicated to the education of young girls. The Assumption Mission Associates is an affiliated organization providing an opportunity for young people to experience working with the sisters in their now various ministries.

History

The congregation was founded in 1839 by two young women: Eugénie Milleret de Brou, (religious name Mère Marie-Eugénie de Jesus), under the direction of the Abbé Combalot, a well-known orator of the time, who had been inspired to establish the institute during a pilgrimage to the shrine of Sainte-Anne d'Auray in 1825. The foundress had previously been a novitiate with the Sisters of the Visitation at La Côte-Saint-André. Catherine O’Neill, born in Limerick, Ireland, on 3 May 1817, was 22 years old when she met Anne Eugenie Milleret in Paris. She soon became part of the small group of young women who formed the first community of the Assumption in 1839, taking the name Mother Thérèse Emmanuel. Novice mistress for over forty years, she is considered the co-foundress, with Saint Marie Eugénie, of the Religious of the Assumption.

The motto of the congregation is "Thy kingdom come", and the congregation aims to combine with a thorough secular education a moral and religious training.

The original habit of the sisters was violet with a white cross on the breast and a violet cincture. The veil was white. On certain occasions a mantle of white with a violet cross on the shoulder was worn in the chapel.

Much of the initial success was due to the staunch friendship of Denis Auguste Affre, Archbishop of Paris. The congregation then spread beyond France to England, Italy, Spain and Nicaragua.
The mother-house was formerly situated at Auteuil, a suburb of Paris, in a former chateau, rich in historical associations, where the daughters of many distinguished European families, as well as many English and Americans studied, and received a special training in the French language.

The sisters ran the Academy of the Assumption, an all-girls school that was located on Biscayne Bay in Miami, Florida from about 1943 to 1976. The property was sold and most of the buildings replaced by luxury high-rise condominiums. The Assumption Chapel became part of St. Jude Melkite Catholic Church.

In 1954 the Assumption Sisters founded the Associate Missionaries of the Assumption (AMA), now Assumption Mission Associates, as a ministry of young adults.

Currently 
As of 2019, the Religious of the Assumption is an international congregation of more than 1200 Sisters of over 40 nationalities, responding to the challenges and calls of society in 35 countries. The Mother House is located in Paris, France, with communities in places including Madrid, Mexico City and Querétaro in Mexico, Manila, Bangkok, and Rwanda.

The Assumption Sisters first came to the U.S. in 1919 and opened Ravenhill Academy, a boarding school for girls, in Philadelphia. In the United States, the order has houses in Worcester, MA; Philadelphia, PA; and Lansdale, PA. They can be found in the inner city and the suburbs, in the rural southwest and the urban Northeast. They teach in colleges and run after-school programs for children; and teach English as a Second Language; they work in parishes and offer faith formation programs. The community in Chaparral, New Mexico works in immigrant advocacy. In January 2018, former superior general Diana Wauters noted that the immigrants the sisters worked with fifteen years age came for economic reasons and educational opportunities for their children, whereas in 2018 "...here on the US/Mexican Border it is largely due to violence, drug cartels, corrupt security forces, impunity, extortion, kidnappings…"

Their communities are committed to effecting change in society through prayer and education. They are a diverse group of women from many countries who live together in close-knit communities.  Prayer is at the heart of their educational mission. A teaching order, it sees education as a process by which the human person is freed and society transformed. That freedom marks their life together in community, as well their work for the coming of the Kingdom of God.

References

External links
 Religious of the Assumption - Official Site
 

Catholic female orders and societies
Religious organizations established in 1839
Assumptionist female orders
1839 establishments in France
Catholic religious institutes established in the 19th century
Catholic teaching orders